Juhan Uuemaa (born Juhan Neumann; 24 July 1903 Hummuli Parish, Viljandi County – 10 April 1942 Kirov, Russia) was an Estonian politician and lawyer. He was a member of VI Riigikogu (its Chamber of Deputies).

References

1903 births
1942 deaths
Members of the Estonian National Assembly
Members of the Riigivolikogu
20th-century Estonian lawyers
University of Tartu alumni
Recipients of the Military Order of the Cross of the Eagle, Class IV
People from Tõrva Parish
People who died in the Gulag
Estonian people who died in Soviet detention
People executed by the Soviet Union by firearm